Epp Annus (born 30 August 1969 in Tallinn) is an Estonian writer and literary scholar.

In 2002, she graduated from the University of Tartu, studying Estonian literature. Her doctoral thesis topic was "Kuidas kirjutada aega".

Works
 2007: novel "Sina, Matilda"
 children books: "Jaak ja lumi", "Jaak läheb poodi", "Oravaraamat", "Oravalapsed vanas majas", "Oravalapsed talvises metsas", "Mari päev", "Oskar läheb õue", "Unelaul kahel häälel", "Väike lumehelbeke", "Täheraamat"

References

Living people
1969 births
Estonian literary scholars
21st-century Estonian women writers
Estonian children's writers
Estonian women children's writers
Estonian women novelists
Writers from Tallinn
University of Tartu alumni